Lewis P. Andreas (February 25, 1895 – June 16, 1983) was an American football and basketball coach and college athletic administrator.  He was the head coach for Syracuse University's men's basketball and football programs beginning in the 1920s. The Sterling, Illinois native played baseball, basketball and football at University of Illinois as a freshman before transferring to Syracuse. He then played football and baseball, but not basketball, for the Orangemen (now Orange) before embarking on his coaching career.

Andreas coached the Orangemen basketball team from 1924 to 1950, except one year World War II when the team was suspended due to travel restrictions.  He guided the Orangemen basketball program to a 358–134 (.726) overall record in 24 years. Led by standout Vic Hanson, his 1925–26 team finished the season with a 19–1 record and was retroactively named the national champion by the Helms Athletic Foundation and the Premo-Porretta Power Poll. In football, Andreas compiled a 15–10–3 overall record between 1927 and 1929. His winning percentage is the highest in program history and 358 career victories are second, only behind Jim Boeheim. At the university he was also the Director of Physical Education and Athletics from 1937 until retirement in 1964. In 1950 he was replaced by assistant coach Marc Guley. 

Off the court he served on the NCAA Basketball Committee on two separate occasions, 1943–44 and 1954–58. He was also was president of the National Association of Basketball Coaches. In 1948 he was inducted into the Helms Collegiate Hall of Fame in 1948. He also 'had a cup of coffee' in the professional leagues as a player for the Syracuse Pros. He died in 1983 and is buried in Oakwood Cemetery.  

Andreas was inducted into the Syracuse Sports Hall of Fame in 1988.

Head coaching record

Football

Basketball

References

External links
 
 OrangeHoops.org profile of Andreas
 Lewis Andreas – New York Times obituary

1895 births
1983 deaths
American football ends
American men's basketball coaches
American men's basketball players
Baseball catchers
Basketball coaches from Illinois
Basketball players from Illinois
Illinois Fighting Illini baseball players
Illinois Fighting Illini football players
Illinois Fighting Illini men's basketball players
People from Sterling, Illinois
Players of American football from Illinois
Syracuse Orange athletic directors
Syracuse Orange football coaches
Syracuse Orange football players
Syracuse Orange men's basketball coaches
Syracuse Orangemen baseball players
Syracuse Pros players